Lung Cheung Road is a major road in New Kowloon, Hong Kong. It forms part of Route 7 linking Kwun Tong Road at Ngau Chi Wan and Ching Cheung Road near Tai Wo Ping. It is a dual 3-lane carriageway running in the east-west direction for its entire length.

Kwun Tong (connected by Kwun Tong Road) in Eastern Kowloon was the main manufacturing centre of Hong Kong during the 1960s. To provide a more efficient link to the Kwai Tsing Container Terminals and Tsuen Wan, two roads were built along the hills to the north of developed Kowloon. Tai Po Road's New Territories and New Kowloon parts divide between Ching Cheung Road and Lung Cheung Road.

The section of between Wong Tai Sin and Choi Hung of the Kwun Tong line was built under the road.

History
Lung Cheung Road opened to traffic on 24 June 1961.

Major junctions
 Nam Cheong Street
 Tai Wo Ping Interchange
 Lion Rock Tunnel
 Tate's Cairn Tunnel
 Chuk Yuen Road
 Ma Chai Hang Road
 Po Kong Village Interchange
 Tai Hom Road
 Hammer Hill Road
 Clear Water Bay Road
 Shatin Pass Road (formerly)

See also

 List of streets and roads in Hong Kong
 Tai Po Road
 Kwun Tong Road

References

1961 establishments in Hong Kong
Roads in New Kowloon
Route 7 (Hong Kong)
Ngau Chi Wan
Wong Tai Sin
New Kowloon articles missing geocoordinate data
Kwun Tong